Vasile Soare is a Romanian diplomat. Ambassador Extraordinary and Plenipotentiary of Romania to Azerbaijan since October 28, 2021.

Biography
On 7 February 2002, Extraordinary and Plenipotentiary ambassador of Romania to Kazakhstan Vasile Soare presented credentials to President Nursultan Nazarbayev. Vasile Soare has studied about the Soviet deportations from Bessarabia and Northern Bukovina.

Also, on 9 September 2003, a memorial monument was unveiled in the Spassk village in the memory of the Romanian World War II prisoners who had been buried in the Karlag memorial cemetery. With the help of the local authorities Vasile Soare discovered that 6,740 Romanian captives were kept in the Karaganda region prisons between 1941 and 1946. 827 of them were buried in the Spassk cemetery.

See also
 Soviet deportations from Bessarabia and Northern Bukovina

References

External links 
 Valurile de deportări-Prezenţa Românilor în Kazahstan –Vasile SOARE {02}
 Romanii din Kazahstan, ajunsi in istorie fara voia lor, isi continua traditia cu inversunare
 Stepa Kazahă - pămant al făgăduinţiei pentru românii din Basarabia şi Bucovina la sfârşit de secol XIX - început de secol XX
 Românii din Kârgâzstan. Al treilea articol din seria dedicata romanilor din Kazahstan.
 Românii din Kârgâzstan
 Romanii din Kazahstan dupa deportari
 Vasile SOARE - PREZENŢA ROMÂNILOR ÎN KAZAHSTAN - ISTORIE ŞI DESTIN

Living people
Eastern Orthodox Christians from Romania
Ambassadors of Romania to Kazakhstan
Ambassadors of Romania to Kyrgyzstan
Ambassadors of Romania to Tajikistan
1957 births